Moorgrund is a former municipality in the Wartburgkreis district of Thuringia, Germany. In December 2020, it was merged into the town Bad Salzungen. The village Möhra was the home of Martin Luther's ancestors.

Villages 

The villages in Moorgrund are:
 Etterwinden
 Gräfen-Nitzendorf
 Gumpelstadt (seat of the municipal administration)
 Kupfersuhl mit Ortsteil Wackenhof
 Möhra (home of Martin Luther's ancestors)
 Waldfisch
 Witzelroda mit Ortsteil Neuendorf

References

Wartburgkreis
Former municipalities in Thuringia